Garland was a middling ship of the English navy, built by Andrew Burrell at Deptford and launched in 1620.

Garland fought at the Battle of Dungeness in 1652, where the Dutch captured her.

Notes

References

Lavery, Brian (2003) The Ship of the Line - Volume 1: The development of the battlefleet 1650-1850. Conway Maritime Press. .

Ships of the English navy
Ships of the line of the Dutch Republic
Ships built in Deptford
1620s ships
Captured ships